Audencourt is a former commune of the French department of Nord, merged in 1961 into the commune Caudry.

Audencourt is one of the 12 peerages of Cambrésis (a former province/region in France).

The arms are:

  Argent, a lion gules, and in chief a label of 4 points azure.

Former communes of Nord (French department)